Girdwood may refer to:

Places
 Girdwood, Anchorage, a community within the southern extent of the Municipality of Anchorage in the state of Alaska
 Girdwood Airport in Girdwood, in Anchorage Borough, Alaska, United States
 Girdwood Depot, a passenger railroad station in Girdwood, south of Anchorage, Alaska
 Girdwood, Ontario, railway point and unincorporated place in the Unorganized North Part of Algoma District in northeastern Ontario, Canada
 Girdwood railway station located in Girdwood, Ontario

People with the surname
 Eric Girdwood (1876–1963), British military officer who served as General Officer Commanding the Northern Ireland District from 1931 to 1935
 Gilbert Girdwood (1832–1917), English army and civilian physician and surgeon, academic and author, noted for his service in the Canadian Army
 Ronald Girdwood (1917–2006), Scottish medical doctor, Professor of Medicine at the University of Edinburgh and a President of the Royal College of Physicians of Edinburgh